Claude Pache (born 1 May 1943) is a French rower. He competed in the men's coxed four event at the 1964 Summer Olympics.

References

1943 births
Living people
French male rowers
Olympic rowers of France
Rowers at the 1964 Summer Olympics
Place of birth missing (living people)